Spring Farm Advanced Resource Recovery Facility (or Spring Farm ARR Facility, formerly Macarthur Resource Recovery Park, and originally Jacks Gully Waste and Recycling Centre) is a Resource Recovery Facility, Materials Recycling Facility, and landfill located in Spring Farm, New South Wales, Australia.

Spring Farm ARR Facility currently takes 115,000 to 130,000 tonnes of waste from more than 104,000 households per annum from Camden, Campbelltown, Wollondilly and Wingecarribee councils plus a portion from Liverpool. Plus an additional 10,000 tonnes per annum of commercial and industrial waste.

History
Jacks Gully landfill was initially handed over to the State from the local authority in 1973  as the existing council landfill at Springs Road became full. Jacks Gully landfill is owned by WSN Environmental Solutions.

After major redevelopment of the Jacks Gully landfill it was transformed into an Ecolibrium Mixed Waste Facility under a 15-year contract recently awarded to WSN Environmental Solutions. This development featured an ArrowBio mechanical biological treatment system, in-vessel composting and a visitor's centre. However this was decommissioned in February 2011 because of an odour footprint. The facility was acquired by SUEZ and renamed to Spring Farm Advanced Resource Recovery Facility.

See also
New South Wales Greenhouse Gas Abatement Scheme

References

Landfills in Australia
Geography of Sydney